G-Note Records is a subsidiary record label of 50 Cent's G-Unit Records. The label was formed in late 2010 for pop, dance and R&B artists. The offices for the label are in New York.

Origins (2010)
After the success of former G-Unit subsidiary label "G-Unit South,"G-Unit Philly, and "G-Unit West, 50 Cent decided to create another subsidiary in 2009. Unlike the two other subsidiary labels, G-Note Records is a Hip hop based label including Pop, Dance and R&B music. The label was founded in late 2010 with the first two artists signed, Governor and Hot Rod. The first official music that was released under the label was Hot Rod's first single called Dance With Me. It was believed that 50 Cent intended to sign more acts to the label in the upcoming year, including R&B singer Jovan Dais who was featured on the original version of his single "Baby By Me", Zimbabwean singer Gamu Nhengu, and singer Jeremih who he has recently worked on a couple of projects with. The second single released on the label was Governor's, the song was called "Here We Go Again" and featured 50 Cent. In an interview with G-Unit Radio 50 Cent said he created the label because 
In late April 2011, it was reported that 50 Cent was in talks with DJ Pauly D about signing to the label for a three-album deal. This was later confirmed by DJ Whoo Kid in an interview with Shade 45.
In the beginning of December 2011, DJ Pauly D was officially signed to G-Note Records. Lea was dropped from the label at the top of 2013.

Roster

Current artists

Former Artists

Discography

Upcoming releases

References

50 Cent
2009 establishments in New York City
American record labels
Companies based in New York City
G-Unit Records
Contemporary R&B record labels
American hip hop record labels
Pop record labels
Record labels established in 2009